Ayr Township may refer to the following:

 Ayr Township, Adams County, Nebraska, USA
 Ayr Township, Fulton County, Pennsylvania, USA
 Township of Ayr, Shire of Burdekin, North Queensland, Queensland, Australia; see Ayr, Queensland

See also
 Ayr (disambiguation), including towns Ayr
 Ayr County (disambiguation)
 Ayrshire (disambiguation), Ayr Shire